Kariz Now-e Sofla (also Romanized as Kārīz Now-e Soflá; also known as Kārīz Now) is a village in Mian Jam Rural District, in the Central District of Torbat-e Jam County, Razavi Khorasan Province, Iran. At the 2006 census, its population was 701, in 148 families.

References 

Populated places in Torbat-e Jam County